Amazing Grace: Jeff Buckley is a 2004 documentary film about Jeff Buckley. It was shot, directed, and produced by first-time filmmakers Nyla Bialek Adams & Laurie Trombley.

Synopsis 
The documentary focuses on the life and career of American musician Jeff Buckley. The film features footage taken from his performances as well as footage from interviews he held during his lifetime, up until his death in 1997. Performances and outtakes have been culled from the warehouse archives of Columbia Records.

Production 
The documentary marked the directorial debut of both Nyla Bialek Adams and Laurie Trombley, who also served as its producers. Adams additionally served as editor alongside John Neely. It took the directors six years to finish shooting the film and they began toward the end of 1999, 2 years after Buckley's death. Per Rolling Stone, Buckley's mother gave Adams and Trombley her blessings for the project.

Profits from the film's distribution went to charities associated with the Estate of Jeff Buckley.

Release 
Amazing Grace: Jeff Buckley premiered on October 16, 2004 at the CMJ New Music Marathon Film Festival. The documentary was later released as a bonus DVD for the deluxe version of the album Grace Around the World, issued by Sony Legacy in 2009.

Reception 
Critical reception for Amazing Grace: Jeff Buckley  has been mostly positive. Paste magazine reviewed the film, noting that "This reverent, powerful film doesn’t answer any questions about Buckley’s death, but it assures that his greatest gifts are still with us." Denis Harvey of Variety was more critical, writing that "Electrifying performance footage in "Amazing Grace" underlines the sense that a great talent was lost. But this less-than-definitive docu portrait works overtime abetting his tragic-hero mythology, worshipping the artist but omitting insight into the man."

References

External links 

Amazing Grace: Jeff Buckley on Rotten Tomatoes
27 Years of Jeff Buckley’s Amazing “Grace” The Daily star, Aug 23, 2021

2004 documentary films
American documentary films
2000s English-language films
2000s American films